Clinotarsus is a genus of ranid frogs. Members of this genus are found in India and Southeast Asia.

Species
There are three species recognised in the genus Clinotarsus:

References

 
True frogs
Amphibians of Asia
Amphibian genera
Taxa named by St. George Jackson Mivart